The Sign of the Cross is a 1932 American pre-Code epic film produced and directed by Cecil B. DeMille and released by Paramount Pictures. Based on the original 1895 play by English playwright Wilson Barrett, the screenplay was written by Waldemar Young and Sidney Buchman. It stars Fredric March, Elissa Landi, Claudette Colbert, and Charles Laughton, with Ian Keith and Arthur Hohl.

Both play and film have a strong resemblance to the 1895–96 novel Quo Vadis and, like the novel, take place in ancient Rome during the reign of Nero. The art direction and costume design were by Mitchell Leisen, who also acted as assistant director. Karl Struss was nominated for an Academy Award for Best Cinematography. It is the third and last in DeMille's biblical trilogy, following The Ten Commandments (1923) and The King of Kings (1927).

Plot

During the Great Fire of Rome in AD 64, Emperor Nero fiddles. Tigellinus informs Nero that he is suspected of starting the fire. Nero instead has the fire blamed on the Christians. In Rome, the Apostle Titus, Mercia, and Favius are apprehended by a mob for being Christians. Marcus Superbus, the prefect of Rome, arrives and disperses the mob allowing the Christians to go free.

News of Marcus's mercy towards the Christians spreads throughout Rome, including Empress Poppaea. At a fountain, Marcus meets with Mercia again; there, Licinius reads Nero's edict to Marcus reminding him of his duty to arrest Christians. Later that night, Titus sends Stephan, a young Christian man, to tell other Christians of the secret meeting at the Cestian Bridge. Shortly after, Marcus arrives at Mercia's home wanting to take her for himself, but Mercia decides to stay. Stephan is arrested by Licinius under suspicion of being a Christian. In a dungeon, Stephan is tortured, and reveals the location of the Christians' secret meeting.

After learning of Stephan's arrest and torture, Marcus races to the meeting hoping to save Mercia. Along the way, he crashes into Poppaea's carriage. She demands for Marcus to stay, but he leaves her and promises to be with her in the morning. At the meeting, Roman soldiers surround the Christians where Titus and some members of his congregation are struck dead by arrows. Marcus arrives at the meeting and saves Mercia, and takes her home, while the other Christians are arrested and sent into the prison chamber.

The next morning, Poppaea scolds Marcus for his affections to Mercia. Elsewhere in the palace, Tigellinus informs Nero of Marcus's disobedience to his edict, in which Nero accuses Marcus of betrayal. Jealous of Mercia, Poppaea influences Nero to sign an order for Mercia to be arrested from Marcus's home. At a feast in Marcus's home, he introduces Mercia to Ancaria, who performs an exotic dance. Outside of Marcus's home, Ancaria's performance is drowned out by the Christians' singing. Annoyed by the singing, Marcus sends his party away so he may be left alone with Mercia. He demands for Mercia to renounce her Christian faith so she may be with him, but she refuses. Shortly after, Licinius arrives to arrest Mercia, who is to be executed for treason amongst one hundred Christians in the arena.

Marcus returns to Nero's palace and demands for the emperor to spare Mercia, but Nero refuses. In the arena, the audience is entertained by several spectacles, including gladiator battles. When the time for the Christians' execution arrives, Mercia is told to stay behind by Poppaea's orders as she is to be executed alone. In the arena, the Christians are mauled to death by lions. Following the execution, Marcus again asks for Mercia to renounce her faith and be his wife. Mercia refuses once more, but she states that she loves him. Refusing to live without her, Marcus accompanies Mercia where they are both executed.

Cast

 Fredric March as Marcus Superbus, prefect of Rome
 Elissa Landi as Mercia
 Claudette Colbert as Empress Poppaea
 Charles Laughton as Emperor Nero
 Ian Keith as Tigellinus
 Arthur Hohl as Titus
 Harry Beresford as Favius Fontellus
 Tommy Conlon as Stephan
 Ferdinand Gottschalk as Glabrio
 Vivian Tobin as Dacia
 William V. Mong as Licinius
 Joyzelle Joyner as Ancaria
 Richard Alexander as Viturius
 Nat Pendleton as Strabo
 Clarence Burton as Servillius
 Harold Healy as Tybul
 Robert Manning as Philodemus
 Charles Middleton as Tyros
 Mischa Auer as Christian in Dungeon (uncredited) 
 Lionel Belmore as Bettor (uncredited) 
 Henry Brandon as Spectator (uncredited) 
 Edward LeSaint as Spectator (uncredited)

Production

The famous scene in which Poppaea (Claudette Colbert) bathes in asses' milk took several days to shoot. DeMille announced to the press that real asses' milk was used; however, it was actually powdered cow's milk. After a few days under the hot lights, the milk turned sour, making it very unpleasant for Colbert to work in the stench.

To save production expense during the Great Depression, existing sets were reused as well as costumes left over from the making of The Ten Commandments (1923). DeMille also attempted to provide out-of-work actors jobs as extras such as the crowd arena scenes.

Marketing and distribution
Paramount marketed the film using market segmentation by focusing their promotion efforts on three market segments. The first was general moviegoers and movie enthusiasts who enjoyed certain features of religiously themed movies, movie goers who regularly attended church, and students of primary and elementary schools.

Reception
In 2008, the film was nominated for the American Film Institute's 10 Top 10 in the Epic Film category.

Editing for reissue after enforcement of the Production Code 
As with many other pre-Code films that were reissued after the Motion Picture Production Code was strictly enforced in 1934, this film has a history of censorship. In the original version, Marcus Superbus (Fredric March) is unsuccessful in his attempt to seduce Mercia (Elisa Landi), an innocent Christian girl. He then urges Ancaria (Joyzelle Joyner) to perform the erotic "Dance of the Naked Moon" that will "warm her into life". This "lesbian dance" was cut from the negative for a 1938 reissue, but was restored by MCA/Universal for its 1993 video release. Some gladiatorial combat footage was also cut for the 1938 reissue, as were arena sequences involving naked women being attacked by crocodiles and a gorilla. These were also restored in 1993.

DeMille himself supervised a new version for its 1944 rerelease. New footage with a World War II setting, featuring actor Stanley Ridges (who did not originally appear in the film) was added to make the film more topical. In the new prologue, a group of planes is seen flying over what was ancient Rome. The conversation of the soldiers in one of the planes leads directly into the film's original opening scene. The last few seconds of the edited version of the film showed the planes flying off into the distance, rather than simply fading out on the original closing scene of the movie.

For many years, this edited version was the only one available. The version now shown on Turner Classic Movies has been restored to the original 125 minute length by the UCLA Film and Television Archive with the help of the DeMille estate and Universal Television, which now owns most pre-1950 Paramount sound features.

Catholic Legion of Decency
The reaction of the Catholic Church in the United States to the content in this film and in Ann Vickers helped lead to the 1934 formation of the Catholic Legion of Decency, an organization dedicated to identifying and combating objectionable content, from the point of view of the Church, in motion pictures.

Home media
This film, along with Four Frightened People (1934), Cleopatra (1934), The Crusades (1935) and Union Pacific (1939), was released on DVD in 2006 by Universal Studios as part of The Cecil B. DeMille Collection, a new Blu-ray edition was released on August 25, 2020 by Kino Lorber.

See also 
 Nudity in film
 The Sign of the Cross (1914 silent film)
 The Sign of the Cross (play)

References 
Citations

Bibliography
 Barrett, Wilson The Sign of the Cross, J.B. Lippincott Company, (Philadelphia), 1896: Barrett's novelized version of his play.
 
 
 

Online sources

External links 

 
 
 
 
 The Sign of the Cross at Virtual History

1932 films
1932 drama films
American films based on plays
American drama films
American epic films
American black-and-white films
Articles containing video clips
Films directed by Cecil B. DeMille
Films set in the 1st century
Films set in the Roman Empire
Paramount Pictures films
Religious epic films
Depictions of Nero on film
Cultural depictions of Poppaea Sabina
Films set in Rome
Lesbian-related films
Films with screenplays by Sidney Buchman
Films about gladiatorial combat
World War II films made in wartime
1940s English-language films